Bażanówka  is a village in the administrative district of Gmina Zarszyn, within Sanok County, Subcarpathian Voivodeship, in south-eastern Poland.

The village has a population of 1100.

References

Villages in Sanok County